Paulette Badjo Ezouehu is a politician who was the Minister of Human rights and Public Liberties of the Republic of the Ivory Coast from January 2016 to January 2017. Ezouehu also chaired the National Commission of Inquiry into the atrocities and crimes committed during the 2011 Second Ivorian Civil War.

Awards
Officer of the National Order of Ivorian Merit

References 

Ivorian human rights activists
Year of birth missing (living people)
Living people
Human rights ministers of Ivory Coast
21st-century Ivorian women politicians
21st-century Ivorian politicians